The Solution is a single handed hiking dinghy designed for helms in the 65 to 85 kg (10 to 14 Stone) weight range. It has a light epoxy hull, self draining cockpit, high aspect rig, semi battened 8.5 sq. metre sail, and full complement of dual controls.

History 

The original design by Kevin Clark and Andrew Elliott dates from 2005. The design is similar to that of the Phantom, though aimed at lighter sailors. The boat was originally marketed by Red Eye Sails with the name Red Eye Solution, the hulls being manufactured by Ovington Boats. The boat was reviewed by Yachts and Yachting,  by Dinghy Magazine  and by Sail-World. In 2008 the entire Solution operation was taken over by Ovington. The Red Eye fish logo was retained, and remains the class symbol. Several design changes were introduced at this time.

 GRP mainsheet tower (previously metal)
 Recessed adjustable forestay block (previously a raised block)
 Straight transom bar and rudder stock
 Selden mast and boom
 New Hyde sail

Characteristics 

All Solution hulls are of foam sandwich epoxy vacuum bagged construction, with a fully draining cockpit and wide side decks for comfortable hiking. The hull, sails, rig and foils are a strict one design to control costs. However, considerable freedom is allowed in the placement of fittings to allow boats to be tailored to personal preference.

The mast is a sealed section with a halyard running inside the track to help prevent inversion on capsize. The mast has single spreaders and lower shrouds to allow adjustment for different helms and conditions. The forestay is adjustable to allow depowering in conjunction with a cascade style kicker. A pivoting centreboard and rudder are made of moulded glass fibre construction. The laminate sails are available in two cuts to suit different sailors.

Sailing clubs with Solution dinghies 

Solution dinghies are sailed at the following clubs in the UK:

 Bala
 Blakeny
 Bough Beech
 Bowmoor
 Bradford on Avon
 Broxbourne
 Burghfield
 Calshot
 Chase
 Clevedon
 Delph
 Fishers Green SC
 Grafham Water
 Gunfleet
 Hickling Broad
 Hunts
 Hykeham
 Leigh and Lowton
 Llandudno
 Lyme Regis
 Newhaven and Seaford S.C.
 Melton Mowbray
 North Staffs
 Northampton
 Ogston
 Olton Mere
 Overy Staithe
 Oxford
 Penzance
 Portishead
 Redditch
 Redesmere
 Rhosneigr
 Ripon
 Rutland
 Seafarers
 Severn
 South Shields

References

External links 
 UK Solution Class Association

Dinghies